Gheyb Ben Ali (also Romanized as Gheyb Ben ‘Alī) is a village in Ben Moala Rural District, in the Central District of Shush County, Khuzestan Province, Iran. At the 2006 census, its population was 117, in 20 families.

References 

Populated places in Shush County